Mucrosquama is a genus of chitons, a polyplacophoran mollusc in the family Chitonidae, first described in 1926 by Tom Iredale and Arthur Francis Basset Hull. The type species is Mucrosquama carnosus first described as Chiton carnosus by Angas in 1867.

There are two species in this genus:

 Mucrosquama carnosa (Angas, 1867)
 Mucrosquama verconis (Torr & Ashby, 1898)

Two further species have been named but are synonymised with those above.

 Mucrosquama nielseni Cotton & Weeding, 1939 accepted as Mucrosquama carnosa (Angas, 1867)
 Mucrosquama sheardi Cotton & Weeding, 1939 accepted as Mucrosquama verconis (Torr & Ashby, 1898)

References

Chitonidae
Animals described in 1926
Taxa named by Tom Iredale
Taxa named by Arthur Francis Basset Hull
Chiton genera